Department of Agriculture and Food may refer to:

Department of Agriculture and Food (Western Australia), former name of Department of Primary Industries and Regional Development
Department of Agriculture and Food (Ireland), former name of Department of Agriculture, Food and the Marine